Bedford Girls' School Rowing Club is a rowing club based on the River Great Ouse at the Harpur Trust / Longholme Boathouse, The Embankment by Butterfly Bridge, Bedford, Bedfordshire

History
The boat club is owned by Bedford Girls' School with rowing being a major school sport. 

In 2012, Bedford High School merged with Dame Alice Harpur School to become Bedford Girls' School, which also resulted in the Bedford High School Boat Club and Dame Harpur Alice School Boat Club merging and becoming the Bedford Girls' School Rowing Club. The boathouse is a three sectioned shared building with Bedford School Boat Club and Bedford Modern School Boat Club.

The club has produced multiple British champions.

Honours

British champions (as Bedford High School)

British champions (as Dame Alice Harpur School)

British champions (as Bedford Girls' School)

References

Sport in Bedfordshire
Sport in Bedford
Rowing clubs in England
Rowing clubs of the River Great Ouse
Bedford
Scholastic rowing in the United Kingdom
Women's rowing in the United Kingdom